"I Can't Imagine the World Without Me" is the third single from English rock band Echobelly's debut album, Everyone's Got One. It was released as a single on 20 June 1994. The song is about Sonya Madan's self-confidence, hence the name. It reached 39 in the UK Singles Chart. The song was included on both of the greatest hits albums that Echobelly have released: I Can't Imagine the World Without Me and The Best of Echobelly. The B-sides were re-released on the expanded version of Everyone's Got One.

Music video

The music video predominantly features the band playing in a field, whilst trying to show Sonya Madan's self-confidence and ego.

Track listing

Notes

The promo version only contains track 1
The 7" vinyl version only features tracks 1 & 2 (1 as the A-side, 2 as the B-side)
The 12" vinyl version features track 1 as the A-side and tracks 2 & 3 on the B-side.

Credits
Bass & Whistle – Alexander Keyser
Drums – Andy Henderson 
Guitar – Glenn Johansson, Debbie Smith
Voice – Sonya Madan
Piano (tracks 1 & 2) & Orchestral Arranger - Lino Robinson
Trumpet (track 1) - Barbara Snow
Engineer (besides track 2)– Dick Meaney
Cover Photography – Ray Burmiston
Producer – Echobelly
Track 1 Mixer - Alan Moulder
Track 2 Mixer and Engineer - Nick Addison
Track 3 Mixer - Dick Meaney

References

External links
 https://www.discogs.com/Echobelly-I-Cant-Imagine-The-World-Without-Me/release/994931

1994 singles
Echobelly songs
1994 songs